A constructional system or a constitution system is a system of objects or concepts of a certain domain in which all objects or concepts of that domain can be logically constructed from a proper subset of those objects or concepts, called the basis of the system. 

The notion of constructional systems can be traced back to Bertrand Russell, who wrote in 1914  that 

German philosopher Rudolf Carnap in his Der logische Aufbau der Welt (1928) (referring to them as "Konstitutionssystems") and American philosopher Nelson Goodman in his The Structure of Appearance (1951) studied the structure of constructional systems.

References

Cited works
 
 

Metaphysical theories